The ayu sweetfish (Plecoglossus altivelis),   or sweetfish, is a species of fish. It is the only species in the genus Plecoglossus and family Plecoglossidae. It is a relative of the smelts and other fish in the order Osmeriformes.

Native to East Asia, it is distributed in the northwestern Pacific Ocean along the coast of Hokkaidō in Japan southward to the Korean Peninsula, China, Hong Kong and northern Vietnam. It is amphidromous, moving between coastal marine waters and freshwater lakes and rivers. A few landlocked populations also exist in lakes in Japan such as Biwa. Original wild populations in Taiwan became extinct in 1968 due to pollution and present extent populations were reintroduced from Japan in the 1990s.

The name "sweetfish" was inspired by the sweetness of its flesh. Some individuals live two to three years. The ayu is the prefectural fish of Gunma Prefecture and Gifu Prefecture.

Subspecies
Two to three subspecies are recognized by some authors. Others do not distinguish the subtaxa.

Subspecies include:
 P. a. altivelis (Temminck & Schlegel, 1846) (ayu, sweetfish)
 P. a. chinensis Y. F. Wu & X. J. Shan, 2005 (Chinese ayu)
 P. a. ryukyuensis M. Nishida, 1988 (Ryukyu ayu-fish) – endangered

Biology

An omnivore, the ayu feeds on algae, crustaceans, insects, sponges, and worms. It feeds on algae that accumulates on the rocks, scraping it off the rocks with their saw-shaped teeth. Adults typically maintain a feeding territory, but the form restricted to lakes and associated streams is schooling.

Most populations of this species are amphidromous and breed in the lower part of rivers during the autumn, laying their eggs in small pits they dig in the gravel. The eggs hatch shortly after and the larvae are carried downriver to the sea. Here they reach  by the summer. They reach maturity by the autumn and move down to the lower part of rivers to breed. Some die after breeding and only live one year, but others return to live in the ocean and may spawn up to three times, each time moving into the lower part of rivers in the autumn. In Japan, some populations live their entire life in freshwater, only moving between lakes and the associated streams where they breed. These have a more variable migration pattern, moving upstream from the lakes in the spring, summer or autumn. Although their larvae mostly stay within freshwater, some are carried downstream with the current to the sea and become part of the amphidromous populations. The freshwater-restricted populations typically reach an age of two or three years. During the breeding season the amphidromous and freshwater-restricted forms may occur together. Ayu are also stocked in reservoirs.

The form restricted to freshwater is considerably smaller than the amphidromous form. This is caused by differences in the availability of food.

Human uses

Ayu is an edible fish, mostly consumed in East Asia. Its flesh has a distinctive, sweet flavour with "melon and cucumber aromas". It is consequently highly prized as a food fish. The main methods for obtaining ayu are by means of fly fishing, by using a fish trap, and by fishing with a decoy which is known as ayu-no-tomozuri in Japan. The decoy is a living ayu placed on a hook, which swims when immersed into water. It provokes the territorial behavior of other ayu, which assault the "intruder" and get caught.

Japanese fishers also catch it using cormorant fishing. On the Nagara River where Japanese cormorants (Phalacrocorax capillatus) are used by the fishermen, the fishing season draws visitors from all over the world. The Japanese cormorants, known in Japanese as umi-u (ウミウ, "sea-cormorant"), are domesticated birds trained for this purpose. The bird catches the ayu, stores it in its crop, and delivers it to the fishermen.

Ayu is also fished commercially, and captive juveniles are raised in aquaculture before being released into rivers for sport fishing.

A common method of preparing ayu and other small fish in Japan is to skewer it in such a way so that its body forms a wave, making it look as though it is swimming.

Gallery

References

Further reading
 Takeshima, Hirohiko; Iguchi, Kei-ichiro & Nishida, Mutsumi (2005): Unexpected Ceiling of Genetic Differentiation in the Control Region of the Mitochondrial DNA between Different Subspecies of the Ayu Plecoglossus altivelis. Zool. Sci. 22(4): 401–410.  (HTML abstract)

External links

 Plecoglossus altivelis. Integrated Taxonomic Information System (ITIS).

Fauna of Hong Kong
Freshwater fish of Japan
Plecoglossidae
Fish of Korea
Fish described in 1846
Edible fish